An athlete is a person who participates regularly in a sport or sports that involve physical exertion, especially athletics (sports involving competitive running, jumping, throwing and walking).

Athlete or athletes may also refer to:

 ATHLETE (All-Terrain Hex-Legged Extra-Terrestrial Explorer), a lunar rover under development by NASA
 Athlete (band), an English indie rock band
 Athlete (EP), a 2002 EP by Athlete
 Athlete (2010 film), a sports documentary film
 Athlete (2019 film), a Japanese film 
 Athletes (moth), a genus of Saturniinae moth
 Athletes (film), a 1925 German silent film
Athletes (1977 series), paintings by American artist Andy Warhol

See also 
 
 
 Athletic (disambiguation)
 Athletics (disambiguation)
 The Athlete (disambiguation)
 Mathlete, a person who competes in mathematics competitions